Samuel L. Duncan was a member of the South Carolina House of Representatives from 1872 until 1876 and in the South Carolina Senate from 1876 until 1880. A Republican, he represented Orangeburg. He opposed a bill to provide artificial legs to Confederate South Carolina veterans because it excluded U.S. Army veterans. He was from Fort Motte. He signed opposition to a delay of a State Senate investigation into the abuse of prisoners sent to work for railroads and other businesses.

Duncan was born in the 1910s and died shortly before the start of World War I.

References

Republican Party members of the South Carolina House of Representatives
Republican Party South Carolina state senators
19th-century American politicians
Year of birth missing (living people)